Kaden is a surname and a given name.

Notable people with the given name "Kaden" include
Kaden Elliss (born 1995), American football player
Kaden Fulcher (born 1998), Canadian ice hockey player
Kaden Groves (born 1998), Australian cyclist
Kaden Hensel (born 1986), Australian tennis player
Kaden Honeycutt (born 2003), American racing driver
Kaden Hopkins (born 2000), Bermudian cyclist
Kaden Rodney (born 2004), English footballer
Kaden Smith (born 1997), American football player

Notable people with the surname "Kaden" include
Allison Kaden (born 1977), American reporter
André Kaden (born 1978), German figure skater
Ellen Kaden, American corporate executive
Lewis B. Kaden (1942–2020), American businessman
Richard Kaden (1856–1932), German violinist
Ulli Kaden (born 1959), German boxer

See also 
Tōshi Kaden, Japanese biographical record of the Fujiwara clan

English masculine given names
Surnames